Margaret Lewis is an Australian politician. She was a Labor member of the Victorian Legislative Council for Northern Victoria at 11 June 2014, she was appointed to a casual vacancy caused by the resignation of Candy Broad.

Lewis not did re-contest the 2014 Victorian state election.

References

Year of birth missing (living people)
Living people
Australian Labor Party members of the Parliament of Victoria
Members of the Victorian Legislative Council
21st-century Australian politicians
Women members of the Victorian Legislative Council
21st-century Australian women politicians